Lewis Weldin House was a historic home located at Newport, New Castle County, Delaware. It was a two-story gable-roofed brick building, seven bays wide. It was built in the late 18th century as a residential/commercial building, and renovated in 1863 by Lewis Weldin to serve as his residence.  The building was demolished between 2007 and 2009.

It was added to the National Register of Historic Places in 1993.

References

Houses on the National Register of Historic Places in Delaware
Houses in New Castle County, Delaware
National Register of Historic Places in New Castle County, Delaware